The Men's mass start competition at the 2023 World Single Distances Speed Skating Championships was held on 4 March 2023.

Results

Semi-finals
The first eight racers from each semifinal advanced to the final.

Semi-final 1
The race was started at 13:36.

Semi-final 2
The race was started at 13:52.

Final
The final was started at 16:58.

References

Men's mass start